Aspergillus awamori is a species of aspergillus that is used to make awamori and shōchū. It can produce citric acid and convert starch to sugar. Aspergillus awamori is often confused with Aspergillus niger as they have very similar morphologies and growth rates at different temperatures, and produce several common. In 1901, Tamaki Inui, lecturer at University of Tokyo succeeded in the first isolating and culturing. In 1910, Genichiro Kawachi succeeded for the first time in cultivating var. kawachi, a variety of subtaxa of A. awamori. This improved the efficiency of shōchū production.

See also
 Aspergillus luchuensis - also known as Aspergillus awamori var. kawachi

References

awamori